The 13027 / 13028 Howrah–Azimganj Junction Kavi Guru Express is an Express train of the Kavi Guru series  belonging to Indian Railways – Eastern Railway zone that runs between  and  in India.

It operates as train number 13027 from Howrah Junction to Azimganj Junction and as train number 13028 in the reverse direction, serving the state of West Bengal.

Coaches

The 13027 / 13028 Howrah–Azimganj Junction Kavi Guru Express has 3 Second Class Chair Car, 7 Sleeper class, 7 General Unreserved & 2 SLR (Seating cum Luggage Rake) coaches. It does not carry a pantry car.

As is customary with most train services in India, coach composition may be amended at the discretion of Indian Railways depending on demand.

Service

As the average speed of the train is below , as per Indian Railways rules, its fare does not include a Superfast surcharge.

Routeing

Traction

As sections of the route are electrified, a Howrah-based WAP-7 / WAP-5 / WAP-4 locomotive hauls the train for its entire journey.

Operation

13027 Howrah–Azimganj Junction Kavi Guru Express runs from Howrah Junction on a daily basis reaching Azimganj Junction the next day.
13028 Azimganj Junction–Howrah Kavi Guru Express runs from Azimganj Junction on a daily basis reaching Howrah Junction on the same day.

Controversy

The train was among the trains investigated by the Comptroller and Auditor General of India based on their introduction .

See also

 Kavi Guru Express
 13015/16 Howrah–Bhagalpur Kavi Guru Express
 12949/50 Porbandar–Santragachi Kavi Guru Express
 19709/10 Udaipur City–Kamakhya Kavi Guru Express

References 

 http://www.thehindu.com/news/national/special-trains-to-commemorate-rabindranath-tagore-swami-vivekananda-birth-anniversaries/article1489454.ece
 https://www.flickr.com/photos/diesel_lover/6916818555/
 https://indiarailinfo.com/train/-train-howrah-azimganj-kaviguru-express-13027/14902/1/1801
 http://www.thehindubusinessline.com/todays-paper/tp-others/tp-states/eastern-railway-flags-off-3-new-trains/article1984026.ece
 http://timesofindia.indiatimes.com/city/kolkata/Comptroller-and-Auditor-General-lens-on-trains-introduced-by-Mamata-Banerjee/articleshow/14829314.cms

External links

Rail transport in Howrah
Railway services introduced in 2011
Kavi Guru Express trains
Rail transport in West Bengal